Ali Musa oglu Guliyev (31 May 1912, Yelizavetpol – 29 January 1989, Baku) was a Soviet and Azerbaijani scientist.

Early life
In 1943, he defended his Ph.D. thesis on “Obtaining Hexamethylenetetramine (urotropine) from Natural Gas”. In 1945, the Synthesis of Additives Laboratory was organized in Azerbaijan Scientific-Research Institute of Oil-Processing. Guliyev headed this laboratory. As a result of experiments by him and his team, lubricating additives, Az.SRI depressor and Az.SRI -4 were applied in industry for the first time in the Soviet Union. In 1948 and 1951, Guliyev and his team of were awarded two Stalin Prizes (later renamed to The USSR State Prize) for these developments.

Career
Guliye trained many other scientists. From 1951 to 1960 he was the Chair of Organic Chemistry in Baku State University. From 1960 to 1974, he chaired the department. In 1958, Guliyev was elected a correspondent member of Azerbaijan, and in 1959, academician of AS of Azerbaijan.

Recognition
Guliyev was elected as a member of the Supreme Soviet of Azerbaijan SSR in VIII and IX convocations. He received two Stalin Prizes and an Azerbaijan SSR State Prize. He was awarded two Orders of the Red Banner of Labour, three Orders of the Badge of Honour and medals, six honorary diplomas of the Supreme Soviet of Azerbaijan SSR, two golden and four silver medals of VDNKh of USSR. The Institute of Chemistry of Additives of AS of Azerbaijan was named after him.

References

1912 births
1989 deaths
Scientists from Ganja, Azerbaijan
Academic staff of Baku State University
Baku State University alumni
Stalin Prize winners
Recipients of the Order of the Red Banner of Labour
Organic chemists
Azerbaijani chemists
Soviet chemists